Erich Johannes Bruno Ponto (14 December 1884 – 14 February 1957) was a German film and stage actor.

Career
Erich Ponto was born in Lübeck as the son of a merchant. After his family had moved to Hamburg-Eimsbüttel, he attended the gymnasium secondary school in Altona and upon his Abitur exam began a study of pharmacy at the University of Munich, where he went to lectures delivered by Nobel prize laureate Wilhelm Röntgen. He worked for a few years as a pharmacist, but was already passionate about acting during his university time – he started to take acting lessons and eventually became a full-time actor.

Ponto gave his debut on stage at the Stadttheater Passau in 1908, followed by engagements in Nordhausen, Reichenberg (Liberec), and Düsseldorf. From 1914 to 1947 he was a member of the Hoftheater Dresden ensemble (Staatstheater Dresden from 1918), in the season 1946/47 also as intendant. On stage his most famous role was that of J.J. Peachum in the original production of Bertolt Brecht's The Threepenny Opera in 1928. During the Third Reich he won the title of a Staatsschauspieler in 1938, the highest title that could be awarded to a stage actor in Nazi-Germany. Later stage roles included Nathan the Wise in 1945 and Willy Loman in Death of a Salesman in 1950.

Ponto only started to appear in films regularly after the start of the sound film, when he was already middle-aged. He became a well-known character actor in German cinema of the 1930s and 1940s, often in eccentric or villainous roles. Among his roles were Mayer Amschel Rothschild in the anti-semitic Nazi film The Rothschilds (1940) and a stuffy school teacher in Die Feuerzangenbowle (1944) with Heinz Rühmann, widely regarded as a film classic in Germany. After World War II he appeared in Carol Reed's British thriller The Third Man (1949), he played Orson Welles' sinister physician in a supporting role. In 1955 Ponto won the German Film Award as the "Best male actor in a Supporting role" for Himmel ohne Sterne (1955). He worked as an actor until shortly before his death.

As a synchronisation actor, Ponto dubbed English-language actors like Lionel Barrymore, Charles Laughton and Charley Grapewin in a number of films between the mid 1930s and early 1950s.

Personal life 
In 1916 he married Tony Kresse, they had two children. Ponto also worked as an acting teacher, among his students was Gert Fröbe of Goldfinger fame. Ponto's final film was Der Stern von Afrika, released in the year of his death. He died at the age of 72 after a long cancer illness. Erich Ponto was the uncle of Dresdner Bank general director Jürgen Ponto, who was murdered by members of the communist RAF in 1977.

Selected filmography 

 Der Geiger von Meissen (1921)
 Woman in the Jungle (1931) - Joyce
 The Man Who Murdered (1931) - Boucher 
 Love, Death and the Devil (1934) - The Old Man
 Santa Joana D'Arc (1935) - Lord Talbot
 The King's Prisoner (1935) - Friseur
 The Last Four on Santa Cruz (1936) - Alexander Ghazaroff
 Schlußakkord (1936) - Jury President
 The Hound of the Baskervilles (1937) - Stapleton
 Tango Notturno (1937) - Poor Man
 The Mystery of Betty Bonn (1938) - Capitain Spurling
 By a Silken Thread (1938) - Theodor Kalbach
 The Four Companions (1938) - Alfred Hintze
 Dreizehn Mann und eine Kanone (1938)
 Hallo Janine (1939) - Mr. Pamion
 Wibbel the Tailor (1939) - Schneider Anton Wibbel
 In letzter Minute (1939) - Alexander Piepenbrink
 The Fire Devil (1940) - Emperor Napoleon Bonaparte
 Die Rothschilds (1940) - Mayer Amschel Rothschild
 Aus erster Ehe (1940) - Professor Skutor
 Wie konntest Du, Veronika! (1940) - Banker
 Achtung! Feind hört mit! (1940) - Mr. Bock
 Kleider machen Leute (1940)
 The Girl from Barnhelm (1940) - Wirt
 Das Herz der Königin (1940) - Singer
 Blutsbrüderschaft (1941) - Director Gösch
 Ich klage an (1941) - Professor Werther
 Leichte Muse (1941) - Chorleiter Palitsch
 Her Other Self (1941) - Geheimrat Wuellner
 Eine Nacht in Venedig (1942) - Director Arnold Richard Schmitz
 The Rainer Case (1942) - Hotel Director
 Attack on Baku (1942) - Jenssen
 Der große Schatten (1942) - Oswald Siebel
 Diesel (1942) - Theodor Diesel
 Ein glücklicher Mensch (1943) - Pauly
 Die beiden Schwestern (1943) - Adolph Menzel
 Die Feuerzangenbowle (1944) - Professor Crey - called Schnauz
 The Master Detective (1944) - Gutsbesitzer Theobald Langendorff
 Philharmoniker (1944) - Straehle
 Der Engel mit dem Saitenspiel (1944) - Barnabas
 Am Abend nach der Oper (1945) - Stephan Schneider
 Der Scheiterhaufen (1945)
 Der Fall Molander (unfinished film, 1945) - Dannemann
 Between Yesterday and Tomorrow (1947) - Professor von Walther
 Film Without a Title (1948) - Mr. Schichtholz
 The Lost Face (1948) - Scientific
 Die kupferne Hochzeit (1948) - Alter Lehrer
 The Court Concert (1948) - Serenissimus
 Love '47 (1949) - Old Man 
 The Third Man (1949) - Dr. Winkel
 Verspieltes Leben (1949) - Mathematic Professor
 Second Hand Destiny (1949) - Professor Sapis
 Hans im Glück (1949)
  (1950) - Plünne (voice)
 Beloved Liar (1950) - Plage
 Doctor Praetorius (1950) - Professor Speiter
 Das fremde Leben (1951) - Prosecutor Knopp
 Veronika the Maid (1951)
 Primanerinnen (1951) - Krautkopf
 No Greater Love (1952) - Minister
 Weekend in Paradise (1952) - Giersdorfs Onkel
 House of Life (1952) - Geheimrat Merk
 Monks, Girls and Hungarian Soldiers (1952) - Fellerer
 The Blue and White Lion (1952) - Government President
 The Great Temptation (1952) - Professor Dr. Gandolphi
 Not Afraid of Big Animals (1953) - Police Commissioner
 Hocuspocus (1953) - Mr. Arthur Graham
 Sauerbruch – Das war mein Leben (1954) - Chefarzt Psychiatrie
 Love is Forever (1954)
 The Flying Classroom (1954) - Medical Councilman
 Keine Angst vor Schwiegermüttern (1954)
 The Missing Miniature (1954)
 The Golden Plague (1954) - Dr. Sierich
 Sky Without Stars (1955) - Father Otto Kaminski
 Ballerina (1956) - Schimanski
 If We All Were Angels (1956) - Magistrate
 Made in Germany (1957) - Professor Virchow
 The Girl and the Legend (1957) - Daniel Defoe
 The Zurich Engagement (1957) - (uncredited)
 Der Stern von Afrika (1957) - Old Frenchman (final film role)

Erich Ponto in the Web

References

1884 births
1957 deaths
Actors from Lübeck
German male film actors
German male stage actors
20th-century German male actors
Recipients of the Cross of the Order of Merit of the Federal Republic of Germany